Oakham School is a public school (English fee-charging boarding and day school) in Oakham, Rutland, England.

The school was founded in 1584 by Archdeacon Robert Johnson, along with Uppingham School, a few miles away. They share a common badge design (and a strong rivalry), but while Uppingham's colours tend towards blue and white, Oakham's are black and red.

Under headmaster John Buchanan, in 1971 Oakham was the first boys' independent secondary school in Britain to accept both male and female pupils throughout the whole school and not just in the sixth form. In 1995, it was the first public school to go on-line.

Leicestershire County Cricket Club occasionally plays games on the school grounds.

History

Oakham School was founded in 1584 by Robert Johnson, Archdeacon of Leicester. Johnson received an income from four church positions and used this wealth to set up a number of charitable institutions, including the two free grammar schools at Oakham and Uppingham. As someone on the Puritan wing of the Church of England he had a strong belief in the benefits of education.

According to Johnson's statutes for the school, "the schoolmaster shall teach all those grammar scholars that are brought up in Oakham, freely without pay, if their parents be poor and not able to pay, and keep them constantly to school." The master of the school was to teach Hebrew, Latin and Greek. Although the schooling was free, permanent attendance meant the loss to a family of an income, so not many very poor would have attended, or wanted the education. The master could supplement his income of £24 per year by taking in boarders. Johnson was careful to ensure that his schools were sufficiently endowed. This endowment was confirmed by royal charter granted by Queen Elizabeth I.

The original school building was restored in the eighteenth century and remained the sole classroom for 300 years. In 1749 a case involving payment of rates recorded that "the school of Uppingham is not nor hath been of equal repute with that of Oakham." The headmastership of John Doncaster (1808–46), himself a previous pupil at the school, saw the school advance academically: "This was the man who returned to his old school at the age of thirty-six, with University honours and university experience, to give it fresh life, and to set a mark on it which it never quite lost". Even so, numbers attending were well below 50, and while Uppingham flourished in the second half of the nineteenth century, Oakham did not to the same extent. Even so, in 1869 Oakham was one of the founding members of the Headmasters' Conference (HMC). In 1875 as a result of the Endowed Schools Act 1869 that threatened the continued existence of the school, there were just 2 day boys and 2 boarders in the school. The exhausted headmaster, William Spicer Wood (1846–75), retired and the new headmaster lasted just three years before being dismissed.

All classes were still taught in the one room - the original old school, which still exists next to the parish church. The school did see some development. Science and modern languages had recently been added to the curriculum. The subjects examined for a scholarship within the school were English history (1066-1603), geography of the British Isles, English grammar, arithmetic, English composition and dictation. A more successful headmaster, E. V. Hodge, headmaster from 1879 to 1902, saw numbers increase, to 125 in 1896, with slightly more boarders than day boys. Then followed onto the scene three successful headmasters - Walter Lee Sargant (1902–29) under whom numbers rose to over 200 with consequent new buildings, Francis Cecil Doherty (1929–34), who went on to be headmaster of Lancing), and Grosvenor Talbot Griffith (1935–57) who took the numbers to over three hundred - before the advent of John Buchanan.

The 125 of Hodge's time was a temporary peak - by 1905 numbers had fallen back to 66. Sargant's response to the obvious financial difficulties which accompanied this decline (there were just 80 boys in the school when he commenced his headmastership) was to apply in 1910 for direct grant status, and to become in effect the boys' grammar school for Rutland at the same time as continuing as a public school for the boarders. New facilities for science teaching were created, boarding accommodation was improved with new building and extensions, and then a new school house was built. Pupil numbers rose again, to 105 in 1910, and to 200 in 1923.

The Memorial Chapel was dedicated on 29 October 1925; it was built as a memorial to the 68 old boys and masters who were killed in the First World War. The Memorial Library was opened in 1955 by Prince Henry, Duke of Gloucester as a memorial to the 82 old boys who were killed in the Second World War.

John David Buchanan took over from Talbot Griffith in 1958, and played himself in quietly until the Circular 10/65 which demanded comprehensivisation of maintained schools, of which Oakham was one as a direct grant school for the Rutland dayboys. He and the Rutland Local Education Authority did not agree on the possibilities of re-organisation of Rutland's schools, and as a result in 1970 the school (then 700 in size, all boys) reverted to full independence from the local authority, and in 1971, Oakham admitted female pupils for the first time, with the intention from the beginning of being co-educational throughout. The school is co-educational throughout the whole age range (10-18), with an approximately 50:50 split at all levels (ca. 550 boys and 500 girls in 2011–12). There are an equal number of girls' houses (8) to boys' houses. When Buchanan retired in 1977 the school was 950 in total size (ca. 550 boys and 400 girls), and the next headmaster, Richard Bull (1977–84, before he went on to be headmaster of Rugby) continued the co-education process; but it was not until 1990 that the process was completed during the headmastership of Graham Smallbone (1985–96) and equality of numbers gained. When Tony Little, later headmaster of Eton, took over in 1996 there were 528 boys and 510 girls in a school of 1038. Furthermore, the school is evenly spread between boarders and day, although there do exist "day boarders" from 13 and "transitional boarders" from 10 to 13.

In 1981, the school was the subject of an action brought by Novello & Co and the Music Publishers Association (UK) for photocopying sheet music for Christmas carols. This was the first case of its kind in the UK. The High Court settlement ordered the school to pay £4250 in damages plus costs.

In 1984 the quatercentenary of the school was celebrated by a visit from Queen Elizabeth II and Prince Philip, Duke of Edinburgh.

In 2005 Oakham School was one of fifty independent schools found guilty of running an illegal price-fixing cartel which had allowed them to drive up fees for thousands of parents. Each school was required to pay a nominal penalty of £10,000 and all agreed to make ex-gratia payments totalling three million pounds into a trust designed to benefit pupils who attended the schools during the period in respect of which fee information was shared.

Lower school

The current school set-up comprises three distinct "levels" of education. The lower school, for children aged 10–13, is also known as "Jerwoods" after the benefactor Old Oakhamian John Jerwood.  The buildings that comprise it mostly date back to the early 1970s, when the four houses that comprise the area were established, but the main building, now the boys' boarding house, Peterborough House, was the old vicarage, which was bought by the school in 1870.  The girls' boarding house, Lincoln, is in a round building to the west, while the two day houses, Sargants for boys and Ancaster for girls, are found on different floors of the main eastern building, which also houses all seven classrooms. During their time in the lower school, pupils study all of the core subjects (mathematics, English, science, history and geography) as well as French and either German or Spanish, religious education, Latin, Design & Technology and ICT. There is also a carousel system of creative and performing arts courses, which include textiles, 2D art and sculpture, and a separate carousel for drama and dance, and pupils take part in a physical education scheme of swimming and general ball skills.

Middle school

All pupils study English (language and literature), mathematics, a dual-award science course, RE and a foreign language (French, German or Spanish) to GCSE, as well as at least two of history, geography and French, which is offered as an alternative to a second humanities subject. Pupils then choose two subjects from a selection, including a second foreign language, drama and theatre studies, art and design subjects, food studies, sports science and a combined Greek and Latin course.

There are ten houses in the middle school, six boarding and four day houses, split evenly between boys and girls. The day houses are located at the north end of campus, in the grounds of the former Oakham Workhouse, later Catmose Vale Hospital. The main building houses the two girls' houses, Gunthorpe and Hambleton, while the boys' houses, Barrow and Clipsham, are in a newer house alongside.

Upper school
Oakham offers both the International Baccalaureate (IB) and AS/A2 levels.

AS/A2 levels
Most students take four subjects at AS Level and continue to A2 level in at least three of those subjects.

International Baccalaureate (IB)
In the upper school, all students take six subjects. Usually, students take a literature course in their own language, another modern or classical language, a science and a mathematics course, a humanities and an arts course. These are at standard or higher level. In addition, all students complete an extended essay, take a course in theory of knowledge and complete a programme of creativity, action and service (CAS).

In recent years the GCSE pass rate has been just short of 100%, with an average of over 10 passes above C (with most at A / A*) per pupil; the A level / IB pass rate similarly has been just under 100%, with over 80% at A / A* or IB equivalent.

In 2019, 49.34% of pupils scored A*-A for their A-Levels examination, whereas 51.88% scored A*-A for their GCSEs. The average IB score for students in 2019 was 36.7.

Houses
Oakham School has a total of 16 houses; 2 in the upper school (1 for boys and 1 for girls), 10 in the middle school (5 boys houses, 5 girls; 4 full boarding, 2 flexi-boarding, 4 day) and 4 in the lower school (Jerwoods) (2 boys, 2 girls).

Upper school
There are two boarding houses for the seventh form, School House for boys and Round House for girls. Both are in Chapel Close.

Sport

Oakham offers a range of sports to its pupils; main sports for boys are rugby (Daily Mail champions twice), hockey, cricket and athletics, and for girls are hockey, netball, tennis and athletics. The school has won the Ashburton Shield at shooting on three occasions.

The school offers, on a voluntary basis, both the Combined Cadet Force and The Duke of Edinburgh's Award; in the latter it has gained over 5000 awards at the three levels of bronze, silver and gold, and is the leading educational establishment in terms of awards gained. In November 2000 the Duke of Edinburgh came to the school to present the 1000th Gold Award.

Old Oakhamians

For a list of notable alumni, see List of Old Oakhamians.

See also
 W. L. Sargant, The Book of Oakham School (1928)
 J. L. Barber, The Story of Oakham School (1984)
 J. D. Buchanan, Operation Oakham (1984) ) 
 Brian Needham, Oakham School - The Continuing Story - unpublished, available for researchers only
 Brian Needham, various internal booklets (Notable Old Oakhamians, Old Oakhamian Obituaries, Old Oakhamian Military War Service, History of OTC / JTC / CCF at Oakham, The Duke of Edinburgh's Award at Oakham, Overseas Expeditions, Scouting and Guiding at Oakham, Cricket / Rugby / Hockey / Netball Statistical Histories, Oakham School and the Boer War, Oakham School and the Great War, Oakham School and the Second World War)

References

1584 establishments in England
Educational institutions established in the 1580s
International Baccalaureate schools in England
Member schools of the Headmasters' and Headmistresses' Conference

Private schools in Rutland
Boarding schools in Rutland
Schools with a royal charter
Oakham
Church of England private schools in the Diocese of Peterborough